Vartdal is a former municipality in Møre og Romsdal county, Norway. The municipality existed from 1895 until its dissolution in 1965. The  area now sits in the northwestern part of the Ørsta municipality, along the Vartdalsfjorden.  The administrative centre was the village Sætre, which is also known as Vartdal. Other villages in the municipality were Flåskjer and Nordre Vartdal. The main church for Vartdal was Vartdal Church, located in the village of Nordre Vartdal.

History
The municipality was established on 1 January 1895 when all of Ulstein located south of the Vartdalsfjorden was separated from the rest of that municipality to form a new municipality which was called Vartdalsstrand.  The new municipality had an initial population of 736. The name was officially shortened to Vartdal in 1918. During the 1960s, there were many municipal mergers across Norway due to the work of the Schei Committee.  On 1 January 1964, Vartdal was merged with the neighboring municipalities of Hjørundfjord and Ørsta to form the new, larger Ørsta. Prior to the merger, Vartdal had a population of 1,315.

Government
All municipalities in Norway, including Vartdal, are responsible for primary education (through 10th grade), outpatient health services, senior citizen services, unemployment and other social services, zoning, economic development, and municipal roads.  The municipality is governed by a municipal council of elected representatives, which in turn elects a mayor.

Municipal council
The municipal council  of Vartdal was made up of 17 representatives that were elected to four year terms.  The party breakdown of the final municipal council was as follows:

Notable residents
Helge Barstad, politician
Eldar Westre, Baker

See also
List of former municipalities of Norway

References

Ørsta
Former municipalities of Norway
1895 establishments in Norway
1964 disestablishments in Norway